Sanyuanqiao station is an interchange station between the Capital Airport Express and Line 10 of the Beijing Subway, located in the Sanyuan Bridge area in Chaoyang District of Beijing. It will be served by Line 12 in 2023.

Station layout 
Both the line 10 and Capital Airport Express stations use underground island platforms.

Fare areas 
Due to a different ticketing system on the Capital Airport Express, the two fare areas are not connected. A transfer between Line 10 and the Capital Airport Express requires passengers to exit from one line and pay a separate fare for the other line.

Exits 
There are 6 exits, lettered A, B, C1, C2, C3, and D. Exits B and D are accessible.

Ridership 
It handled a peak entry and exit traffic of 110,000 people on May 5, 2013.

Gallery

References

Beijing Subway stations in Chaoyang District
Railway stations in China opened in 2008